Pyinzi is a town in eastern  Myingyan District in the center of the Mandalay Region in Myanmar.  It is located at the crossroads where Route 2 goes west to Natogyi, Route 2 goes east to Myittha, and a secondary highway goes south to Kokkosu and Pindale.

Notes

External links
 "Pyinzi Map — Satellite Images of Pyinzi" Maplandia

Populated places in Mandalay Region